Frans van Brederode (February 4, 1465 – August 11, 1490) was a rebel in Holland against the rule of emperor Maximilian, father and regent of Duke Philip the Handsome of Burgundy. 

Duke Philip was Count of Holland - Brederode belonged to the Hook faction in Holland, which didn't acknowledge Maximilian. 

Brederode was born in Vianen. He conquered Rotterdam in 1488 and tried to conquer many other cities. He was successful only in Woerden and Geertruidenberg in 1489.

He was a son of Reinoud II van Brederode and Yolande van Lailang.

1465 births
1490 deaths
Dutch military commanders
People from Vianen
Dutch people who died in prison custody
Frans
15th-century people of the Holy Roman Empire